Chagunius nicholsi is a species of cyprinid in the genus Chagunius that inhabits India and Myanmar. It inhabits India and Myanmar. Its maximum length is 30 cm (11.8 inches), and its maximum published weight is 900 g (1.98 lbs). Its habitat is inland wetlands.

References

Cyprinidae
Fish of India
Fish of Myanmar
Cyprinid fish of Asia